Gromada Tursko Wielkie is a group consisting of several villages, constituted the lowest tier of local government, taking over the role previously played by gmina Tursko Wielkie; at a smaller scale. In communist Poland between 29 September 1954 and 31 December 1972, this assembly was introduced. Gromada was the lowest (next to osiedle) administrative division of Poland.

The Gromadzka National Council was the group's executive organ. These units were created by the Communist Polish Law, and have legal authority.

The gromada continued to function in interwar Poland (administrative division of the Second Polish Republic. Sołectwo) is a subdivision of a gmina (as an auxiliary unit of a commune) from the second world war, to the end of 1954. At present sołectwo is the smallest unit of local government in rural Poland (subordinate to the gmina).

The gromada was originally the name of localities specific to the territorial council developed between the 15th and 18th centuries, and continued to function in Congress Poland.

As of 29 September 1952, Gromada Tursko Wielkie consisted of 13 villages: Matiaszów, Nakol, Niekrasów, Niekurza, Osala, Strużki, Sworoń, Szwagrów, Trzcianka Dolna, Trzcianka Folwarczna, Trzcianka Górna, Tursko Małe and Tursko Wielkie. As of 1 July 1952 the gmina Tursko Wielkie consisted of 13 gromadas: Luszyca, Matiaszów, Niekrasów Ukazowy, Niekurza, Okrągła, Ossala, Rudniki, Strużki, Sworoń, Trzcianka Górna, Tursko Małe, Tursko Wielkie and Zawada.

See also
 Gromada Osiek

References

Gromada Tursko Wielkie